Thomas Glasson Lance (14 June 1891 – 29 February 1976) was a British track cycling racer. He won the tandem competition with Harry Ryan at the 1920 Summer Olympics. He also competed in the sprint event but was eliminated in the repechage.

Shortly before the Olympics, in June 1920, Ryan and Lance set a British quarter-mile record. After retiring from cycling Lance worked as a bookmaker in Brighton.

References

External links
Profile at databaseolympics.com

1891 births
1976 deaths
English male cyclists
English track cyclists
Olympic cyclists of Great Britain
Cyclists at the 1920 Summer Olympics
English Olympic medallists
Olympic gold medallists for Great Britain
Olympic medalists in cycling
Medalists at the 1920 Summer Olympics
People from Paddington
Cyclists from Greater London